The Chinese cobra (Naja atra), also called the Taiwan cobra, is a species of cobra in the family Elapidae, found mostly in southern China and a couple of neighboring nations and islands. It is one of the most prevalent venomous snakes in China and Taiwan, which has caused many snakebite incidents to humans.

Etymology and names 
Naja atra was first described by Danish physician, zoologist, and botanist Theodore Edward Cantor in 1842. The generic name naja is a Latinisation of the Sanskrit word  meaning "cobra". The specific epithet atra comes from the Latin term ater, which means "dark", "black", or "gloomy".

In Mandarin Chinese, the snake is known as Zhōnghuá yǎnjìngshé (simplified: 中华眼镜蛇, traditional: 中華眼鏡蛇, lit. "Chinese spectacled snake", i.e. Chinese cobra), Zhōushān yǎnjìngshé (舟山眼鏡蛇, lit. "Zhoushan spectacled snake", i.e. Zhoushan cobra) or, in Cantonese, faahnchaántàuh (飯鏟頭, lit. "rice paddle head").  "Spectacled snake" refers to the markings which the snake may at times have on the back of the hood that resemble eyeglasses. In Taiwanese, the snake is known as pn̄g-sî-chhèng (飯匙倩/銃, lit. "rice paddle ?"), ba̍k-kiàⁿ-chôa (目鏡蛇, lit. "spectacled snake", i.e. cobra), or tn̂g-ām-chôa (長頷蛇, lit. "long-chinned snake").

Description 

The hood mark shape is variable from spectacle, mask to horseshoe or O- shape and is often linked to light throat area on at least one side. The throat area is clearly defined light which is usually with a pair of clearly defined lateral spots.

The Chinese cobra is iridescent black with a number of distant transversal double lines of a yellow colour. The abdominal surface is pearl or slaty coloured. The dorsal color of the Chinese cobra is usually brown, grey or black, with or without narrow, light transverse lines at irregular intervals which are especially prominent in juveniles. The upper head is usually the same color as the tail and dorsal part of the body, while the sides of the head are lighter in colour. Specimens with other colors on their dorsal surface, such as white, yellow or brown do occur. There may be irregular or scattered crosslines of white to light gray along the upper body and a spectacle marking on the hood. The ventral head and neck are white to light gray or light orange in colour. There is some variation in the colour of the ventral body and tail: it could be white to gray, dark gray mottled with white, or blackish. The populations in different geographic regions of Taiwan show a different composition of ventral colouration: the eastern population is all blackish (100%), the central and southern populations are mostly white to gray (both 80%), and the proportions of blackish and white-gray phases in the northern population are 60% and 30%, respectively.

The head on this species is broad, slightly triangular in shape and is slightly distinct from the neck. The dorsal scales are smooth and glossy, while the dorsolateral scales are strongly oblique. This is a heavy bodied snake, the body is slightly flattened, and may be significantly flattened when threatened, and it has a short tail. The nostrils of this species are large and prominent. The eyes are medium-sized and the iris is a dark dirty yellow dappled with gray-black or blue-black and the pupil is round and jet black.

Like other elapids, this is a proteroglyphous snake with fangs that are permanently erect and are located at the anterior of the upper jaw.

Scalation 
There are 23–29 scale rows around hood (usually 25–27); 19–21 just ahead mid-body (usually 21); ventral scales 161–180 (usually 171 in males, 173 in females); subcaudal scales 37–51 pairs (usually 48 in males, 46 in females). Anal scale is entire.

Identification 
The Chinese cobra is sometimes confused with the Monocled cobra (Naja kaouthia). But it can be easily distinguished by virtue of having lower ventral and subcaudal scale counts, particularly when sex is taken into account.

Distribution and habitat 
This species is found in southeastern China (including the provinces of Sichuan, Fujian, Guangdong, Guangxi, Guizhou, Hunan, Hubei, Zhejiang, and the Island province of Hainan), Hong Kong, northern Laos, northern Vietnam, and Taiwan, where it is much more common in the south.

Its typical habitat is woodlands, shrublands, grasslands, and mangroves. This species is adaptable to a wide range of terrain including grassland plains, jungle, open fields and even heavily populated regions. As an adaptable species, it occurs in a wide variety of habitats across its range. It can be found in rice paddy fields in maritime lowlands to various types of montaine forests, though it avoids dark forest with closed canopy. In primary monsoon season and rain forests, Naja atra inhabits clearings and riverbanks. Higher population density is observed in the vicinity of human settlements, in secondary forests, and in rice paddy fields which are adjacent to forests. It usually hides under leaves, sticks, and rocks.

Behavior 

The Chinese cobra is very alert, seldom cornered, but if confronted will raise its forebody and spread its hood and strike readily if necessary. Adults can be very aggressive, but the younger tend to be more aggressive as they are more nervous to the things surrounding them. The Chinese cobra usually escapes to avoid confrontation with humans. The snake is terrestrial, diurnal and crepuscular. This species has been observed hunting during all daylight periods and as late as 2–3 hours after sunset from March to October, with ambient temperatures of 20–32 °C (68–90 °F).

Diet 
The Chinese cobra has a widely varied diet and it mainly preys on rodents, frogs, toads, and other snakes. It is active during both the day and night. The diet of this snake is highly variable. It preys on any vertebrates from fish to mammals. Juveniles eat mostly amphibians, whereas adults usually prefer reptiles and mammals – during amphibian breeding periods, however, adult cobras eat mostly frogs or toads. The cricket frog (Fejervarya limnocharis), the common tree frog (Polypedates leucomystax), and the Asian common toad (Duttaphrynus melanostictus) are common prey.

Reproduction 

Like other species of cobra, it is an oviparous snake. Mating and egg-laying periods are very extended. As recorded, gravid females will lay between 6 and 23 eggs sometime between May through to the end of July.

Venom 
The Chinese cobra is a highly venomous member of the true cobras (genus Naja). Its venom consists mainly of postsynaptic neurotoxins and cardiotoxins. Four cardiotoxin-analogues I, II, III, and IV, account for about 54% of the dry weight of the crude venom and have cytotoxic properties.

The murine  values of its venom are 0.29 mg/kg IV and 0.53 mg/kg—0.67 mg/kg SC. The average venom yield from a snake of this species kept at a snake farm was about 250.8 mg (80 mg dry weight). According to Minton (1974), this cobra has a venom yield range of 150 to 200 mg (dry weight). Brown listed a venom yield of 184 mg (dry weight).

In Taiwan there were 593 recorded cases of envenomation by the Chinese cobra from 1904 to 1938; of those, 87 cases were fatal, which is a 15% mortality rate. This is higher than mortality rates for Naja naja (the Indian cobra).

Local symptoms in victims caused by a Chinese cobra bite are wound darkening, localized redness and swelling, pain, insensibility, and invariably blisters and necrosis. Necrosis is a serious problem in cases of cobra bite as it may persist for many years after the general recovery of the victim. The following systemic symptoms may also occur: chest discomfort, fever, sore throat, difficulty in swallowing, loss of voice, weak feeling in limbs, walking haltingly, general ache, lockjaw, and difficulty in breathing. Fatality occasionally occurs. The antivenom is widely available and deaths are much rarer than they used to be.

References

External links 

 Venomous Snakes of Southern China
 CITES – NAJA SPECIES
 Snakes of Taiwan (Naja atra – Chinese cobra) 

Naja
Snakes of Asia
Snakes of Southeast Asia
Snakes of China
Reptiles of Hong Kong
Reptiles of Laos
Reptiles of Taiwan
Reptiles of Vietnam
Reptiles described in 1842
Taxa named by Theodore Edward Cantor
Snakes of Vietnam